Chen Liangliang (born 28 September 1984) is a Chinese goalball player. He won a gold medal at the 2008 Summer Paralympics. He was the top scorer in the tournament with 17 goals, and he scored 6 goals in the final against Lithuania.

When he was six years old, he developed blindness after pouring cold well water over his head. He was diagnosed with optic neuropathy. His parents sold everything in the house to cover his medical bills, but he never regained his eyesight. He began to play goalball when he was 15.

References

Male goalball players
1984 births
Living people
Sportspeople from Henan
People from Lankao County
Paralympic goalball players of China
Paralympic gold medalists for China
Goalball players at the 2016 Summer Paralympics
Goalball players at the 2008 Summer Paralympics
Goalball players at the 2012 Summer Paralympics
Medalists at the 2008 Summer Paralympics
Paralympic medalists in goalball
Goalball players at the 2020 Summer Paralympics